Club 57 Tourbillon is a Congolese football club based in Brazzaville. They participated in the CAF Confederation Cup in the 2009 season.

Honours
Congo Premier League: 0

Coupe du Congo: 1
 2008.

Super Coupe du Congo: 0

Performance in CAF competitions
CAF Confederation Cup: 1 appearance
2009 – First Round

External links
African Club Competitions 2009

Football clubs in the Republic of the Congo
Sports clubs in Brazzaville